Manhero, Manhlyoe ( Máñhìyoù myoú) or Man Hio is a town in Muse Township, Muse District, Shan State, Myanmar.

Students cross the border to attend a primary school in China, where Chinese pupils (mostly ethnic Dai) wear Shan (Dai) ethnic costumes while Shan pupils (mostly ethnic Han Chinese) wear Bamar ethnic uniforms.

References

Populated places in Shan State
China–Myanmar border crossings